Peter Andrew Gowland (April 3, 1916 – March 17, 2010) was a famous American glamour photographer and actor. He was known for designing and building his own studio equipment and was active professionally for six decades with his business partner, Alice Beatrice Adams, whom he married in 1941.

Career 
Gowland shot more than 1,000 magazine covers, mostly glamour shots of female models but also portraits of celebrities including Rock Hudson and Robert Wagner. His covers included Rolling Stone, Playboy, and Modern Photography. He invented elite cameras and equipment that he used to shoot pinups and magazine covers. In the late 1950s, Gowland also invented the twin-lens Gowlandflex camera, which used 4-by-5 inch film for high-quality pictures. The camera has since been used by such photographers as Annie Leibovitz and Yousuf Karsh.

Gowland grew up on movie sets and worked as a film extra in his youth. He learned photo lighting and techniques from watching movies being shot. The son of Gibson Gowland and Sylvia Andrew, both actors, he acted in at least 12 films, mostly uncredited. He had a small part in Citizen Kane. He died of surgical complications after fracturing his hip.

The Anatomical Basis of Medical Practice
The 1971 human anatomy textbook The Anatomical Basis of Medical Practice featured photographs by Gowland in the surface anatomy section. The book was authored by professors R. Frederick Becker, James S. W. Wilson, and John A. Gehweiler, and was met with scandal and a feminist boycott, which resulted in the withdrawal by the publisher after only 5000 copies were distributed.

Bibliography
 Classic Nude Photography, 
 Peter Gowland's New Handbook of Glamour Photography, 
 The Secrets of Photographing Women
 Gowland's Guide to Glamour Photography
 How to Photograph Women 1954 Crown, 7 printings
 Art & Technique of Stereo Photography 1954 Crown, LCCN 54011184
 Stereo Photography 1954 Crown, LCCN 54006642
 Figure Photography 1954 Fawcett, 600,000 sold
 How to Take Glamour Photos 1955 Fawcett
 Glamour Techniques 1958 Fawcett
 Photo Secrets 1958 Whitestone
 Glamour Camera 1959 Fawcett
 Face & Figure 1959 Fawcett
 How to Take Better Home Movies 1960 ARCO
 Guide to Electronic Flash 1960 Amphoto
 Photo Ideas 1961 Whitestone
 Peter Gowland Photographs the Figure 1962 Whitestone
 Camera in Hawaii 1963 Whitestone
 Camera in Japan 1964 Whitestone
 Figure Quarterly 1965 Development Corp
 Guide to Glamour Photography 1972 Crown, 16 printings
 Electronic Flash Simplified 1976 Amphoto, 7 printings
 Basic Glamour 1979 School of Modern Photography
 The Secrets of Photographing Women 1981 Crown, 6 printings
 New Handbook of Glamour Photography 1988 Crown - Random House
 Henry Miller Portfolio  18 unbound prints 2000 Roger Jackson Publisher
 Classic Nude Photography 2001 Amherst Media, Inc.

Filmography

Notes

References

  

  

  
 

  

   (publication);  (article).

   (publication).
 
  
 

  .

   (publication);  (article) (US Newsstream database).

External links
 Official website for Peter Gowland
 Ken Kearney blog, 2007
 

Male actors from Los Angeles
20th-century American inventors
20th-century American photographers
1916 births
2010 deaths
United States Army personnel of World War II
United States Army non-commissioned officers
Accidental deaths from falls